Armageddon, frequently abbreviated Arm, is a fantasy MUD set in a desert world called Zalanthas.  It was founded in 1991 by Dan Brumleve, Nasri Hajj, and Santiago Zorzopulos in Urbana, Illinois.  It requires its players to focus on role-playing.

Setting

Armageddons setting began with a heavy influence from Dark Sun, Dune, and other fantasy and science fiction sources, such as The Morgaine Stories by C. J. Cherryh, and Robert Asprin's Thieves' World, but has since grown and evolved.  While some of these elements are still part of the campaign, ongoing development is not focused on maintaining a commitment to those influences due to a prior conflict with Wizards of the Coast over source material. Some conflicting material, such as the existence of kanks, a creature considered intellectual property by Wizards of the Coast, was removed as a result.

The game world has two city-states called Allanak and Tuluk. Allanak has been accessible to players for the entirety of the game's existence, whereas Tuluk has been frequently closed and re-opened throughout the game's history. The city populaces comprise commoners trying to live from day to day, nobles working to rise in power, and templars, civic officials who enforce the will of the cities' Sorcerer-Kings.

City-States

Allanak
Allanak is the setting's original city-state, and is a class-based society with a long and decadent history.  It once ruled the known world, but has since retreated back to its own borders.  Allanak's expansion was orchestrated by the game's players, as was the subsequent loss of these territories.  For many within Allanak, this collapse went unnoticed amid a self-absorbed orgy of violence and pleasure.  Public displays of torture, violent and bloody arena matches, and tremendous indulgences of depravity are typical of Allanak, with the templars exercising power with near impunity.

Tuluk
The other city-state of Tuluk is a young, energetic caste-based society.  Player-influenced events led to the people of Tuluk throwing off the yoke of Allanak's oppression, bringing a sense of growth, expansion, and opportunity that makes Tuluk a center of political maneuvering.  Tuluk is ruled with silent oppression, with people who break the law simply disappearing, fostering a secretive and distrustful atmosphere.

During the occupation of Tuluk, the nobles survived by relying on the common caste to hide them.  This developed a closeness between castes that survives to the present, with the nobility and the common caste often operating closely together, though social boundaries such as a taboo against sexual contact between the castes remain.

Despite Tuluk's player-led history, staff unanimously decided that Tuluk would be closed to players in April 27, 2015, which caused a massive exodus of players who quit the game. It was then reopened in July 2021.

Outposts and Tribes

Smaller outposts and safe havens exist in Zalanthas, generally struggling to remain independent from the city-states.  These communities provide sanctuary from the dangers of the wastes and from the deadly politics and tyranny of Allanak and Tuluk, but typically have harsh and unforgiving local law enforcement. Nomadic tribes have a precarious existence in the wastes, working to survive while fending off beasts, raiders and magickers.

Magickers

Magickers, those who use arcane powers, are seen with dread, hatred and loathing.  Tuluk bans them, while Allanak subjugates their elementalists with gemmed collars; sorcerers are killed mercilessly by either city-state.  To survive, magickers must master their respective elements, or in the case of sorcerers, their inherently tremendous well of power.  The magick system in Armageddon used to feature eight distinct magick classes, seven based on elementalism and the eighth on sorcery.  However, these classes were changed into subclasses, allowing players to play characters with primarily non-magical skills as well as spells. It now features fifteen elementalist subclasses across six elements, with one previously playable element no longer available. The subclasses divide each element's available spells. There are also four sorcery subclasses, each with roughly a quarter of the original sorcerer's spell list.

Muls
Armageddon includes the mul race of human-dwarf crossbreeds found in the Dark Sun setting.  They are primarily bred by noble houses as gladiatorial slaves for the arenas of Allanak and Tuluk.  Roleplaying guidelines from Armageddon suggest that muls, being sterile, often suffer from a sense of meaninglessness.

Game characteristics
In a departure from genre convention, there are no levels to be gained in Armageddon; a player character's fighting prowess, like his ability at woodcrafting or bartering, is measured by skills which rise through use, with no explicit statistical measurement provided to the player.  Skills are raised through constant repetition and failure.

"Perma-death" is another major game element; when a player character dies in Armageddon, it is a one-time, permanent matter.  These factors are intended to help players focus on roleplaying realistically through giving them a true fear of death and a greater concern for their character's interaction with the world than with a numerical skill percentage. Staff offer resurrections for characters that arise from staff mistakes, game bugs, or out-of-character collusion among the killers. However, they do not offer resurrections in the event of out-of-character griefing.

Players are expected to provide a detailed description for their characters.  In a departure from how, in many aspects, Armageddon works to have the game heavily model characters and their interactions rather than relying on human interpretation, descriptions are "flat" text and "their effects are not regulated algorithmically".

As a result of internal controversy, the MUD has developed player conduct rules regarding cybersex that require prior consent for anyone to roleplay sexual interaction with another player character. Until September 2019, it was possible for players to play minor characters, which resulted in cybersex between adult and child characters. The game increased the minimum age of characters to 16.

Technical infrastructure
Armageddon is based on DikuMUD, and is written mainly in C, with elements of JavaScript.  It is unusual in being based on a DikuMUD infrastructure rather than one of the MU* systems more typically used for roleplaying-focused MUDs.

In 2006, a major overhaul to Armageddon called Armageddon Reborn, or more commonly called in the community: Armageddon 2.0 was announced. On May 15, 2012 the project was officially cancelled.

Decline
Various announcements and changes to the game resulted in players departing from the game. After the cancellation of the Armageddon Reborn project, there was a noticeable drop in players. A similar drop can be seen after the initial closure of Tuluk in 2015. The game tracks unique logins per week, which is a measure of how many unique accounts logged into the game in a given week. Since each player has one account, this number signifies how many players connected to the game on a given week. This number was 267 on the last week of 2010, 245 in the last week of 2015, 208 in the last week of 2016, and 171 in the last week of 2020. The average player count of 2021 is roughly 150 players per week, which is comparable to or less than most other roleplaying MUDs currently open today.

Sexual Harassment
On 24 February 2023, a former player posted details of sexual harassment conducted in-game and out-of-game and pointed out that Shalooonsh, an administrator of Armageddon, was responsible. This resulted in the former player being banned from the game. On 27 February, Armageddon staff announced that Shalooonsh had stepped down voluntarily and did not provide further comment. Amidst an outcry, the staff opted to shut down the game's general discussion board for a few days. When it reopened, it would only accept feedback on how to improve the game as well as the community's culture. On 1 March, a producer of the game stated that "abuse of any type is not okay" and admitted on 4 March that he had known Shalooonsh had sexually harassed Armageddon's players as early as 2007, possibly earlier. The earlier message of Shalooonsh's voluntary resignation was amended to state that he was actually fired, albeit for being rude to the game's players, and he was given the option of dictating how his departure from staff would be announced to the players. The staff have yet to condemn sexual harassment as of 9 March 2023.

Reception
Armageddon has been praised as a "complex and professional" MUD that facilitates "high caliber role playing". However this praise has been overshadowed by many negative reviews on websites that feature Armageddon, such as The MUD connector or the Sub-Reddit r/MUDs. Among the negative reviews are many scandals which are most notably mentioned on r/MUDs, which detail many issues the game and its staff has caused upon the playerbase. Such as sexual harassment allegations towards the staff member called Shalooonsh.

A separate discussion board centered on discussion without Armageddon's rules controlling the content posted regarding the MUD was founded in early 2013. It has since attracted over 800 members, including several prominent former players and former staff members, including a former Producer of the game, who represented the highest level of the game's staff.

A spinoff game called Apocalypse MUD was created and played by former players and staff members of the game.

Points of interest

In 1994, Armageddon was found to be one of the top 20 destinations for telnet sessions at National Capital Freenet.

The MUD's staff take pride in having a mission statement that describes administrators' accountability and priorities, which include stability, game balance, consistency, and a "Gee-Whiz Factor".

A major contributor to, and evangelist for, Armageddon has been science fiction and fantasy writer Cat "Sanvean" Rambo.

References

External links
 

1991 video games
Fantasy video games
MUD games
Post-apocalyptic video games
Video games developed in the United States